José María López de Letona Núñez del Pino (26 November 1922 – 3 July 2018) was a Spanish politician who served as Minister of Industry of Spain between 1969 and 1973, during the Francoist dictatorship.

References

1922 births
2018 deaths
Industry ministers of Spain
Government ministers during the Francoist dictatorship